The 2009 CAF Confederation Cup Final was the final of 2009 CAF Confederation Cup, which was the 6th edition of the CAF Confederation Cup, Africa's secondary club football competition organized by the Confederation of African Football (CAF).

The final was played between ES Sétif from Algeria and Stade Malien from Mali. The winners qualified to participate in the 2010 CAF Super Cup against the winner of the 2009 CAF Champions League.

Road to final

Match details

First Leg

Second Leg

External links
2009 CAF Confederation Cup final (1st leg) - Dzfoot
2009 CAF Confederation Cup final (2nd leg) - Afrik-Foot

Final
2009
ES Sétif matches
Stade Malien matches
Association football penalty shoot-outs